Heni Purwaningsih, aged 47, and Yusi Purawati, aged 48, were fatally dumped on cement in Bekasi. Riyadi, Yusi Purawati's neighbor said that they were known to work at an iron company in Kampung Rawa Pasung, Bekasi.

References

2023 murders in Indonesia
February 2023 events in Indonesia
Bekasi